Putivlsky Uyezd (Пути́вльский уе́зд) was one of the subdivisions of the Kursk Governorate of the Russian Empire. It was situated in the western part of the governorate. Its administrative centre was Putivl.

Demographics
At the time of the Russian Empire Census of 1897, Putivlsky Uyezd had a population of 164,133. Of these, 52.5% spoke Ukrainian, 46.9% Russian, 0.4% Yiddish, 0.1% Polish and 0.1% Romani as their native language.

References

 
Uezds of Kursk Governorate
Kursk Governorate